The wailing cisticola (Cisticola lais) is a species of bird in the family Cisticolidae. It is found in Angola,  Eswatini, Lesotho, Malawi, Mozambique, South Africa, Tanzania, Zambia, and Zimbabwe. Its natural habitat is subtropical or tropical high-altitude grassland.

Lynes's cisticola of Uganda, Kenya and northern Tanzania is sometimes regarded as a subspecies of this species.

References

External links
 Wailing cisticola  - Species text in The Atlas of Southern African Birds.

wailing cisticola
Birds of Sub-Saharan Africa
wailing cisticola
Taxonomy articles created by Polbot